Philip Ray (born 21 November 1964) is an English former professional footballer who played as a full back.

References

1964 births
Living people
Sportspeople from Wallsend
Footballers from Tyne and Wear
English footballers
Association football defenders
Burnley F.C. players
Hartlepool United F.C. players
English Football League players
Wallsend Boys Club players